L'Olimpiade is an opera in three acts by Baldassare Galuppi, based on the original libretto of the same name by Pietro Metastasio. It premiered on 26 December 1747 at the Teatro Regio Ducale in Milan.

Recordings
Mark Tucker (Clistene, tenor), Ruth Rosique (Aristea, soprano), Roberta Invernizzi (Argene, soprano), Romina Basso (Megacle, soprano [castrato]), Franziska Gottwald (Licidas, soprano [trouser role]),  (Alcandro, contralto), Filippo Adami (Aminta, tenor); premiere recording on video DVD (2006) Andrea Marcon (conductor), Venice Baroque Orchestra, Dominique Poulange (stage director) Teatro Malibran, Venice – Dynamic Cat. 33545

References

External links
 

1747 operas
Operas by Baldassare Galuppi
Libretti by Metastasio
Italian-language operas
Operas set in ancient Greece
Ancient Olympic Games
Operas